Harry Ward (born 13 June 1997 in Burton-upon-Trent, Staffordshire) is a former professional English darts player who played in the Professional Darts Corporation events.

Career
He reached the final of the 2015 BDO World Youth Championships, losing 3–0 in the final to Colin Roelofs.

In January 2019, Ward won a two-year PDC Tour Card by right on the first day of the event, beating Mark McGeeney 5–2 in the final.

Ward won his first PDC title at the sixteenth Players Championship of 2019, beating Max Hopp 8–7 in the final at Barnsley Metrodome.

Later in the year, he qualified for his first World Championship via PDC Pro Tour, he faced Latvian Madars Razma in the first round and in a very close match Ward won 3-2. In the second round, he lost 0-3 to Simon Whitlock.

After the restart of the season due to Covid-19, Ward came through the qualifying rounds to earn a debut appearance in the World Series of Darts Finals. At the event, he lost 2-6 to Darius Labanauskas.

In September 2020 he announced a shock decision to step away from the PDC circuit at the end of the 2020 season.

World Championship results

PDC
 2020: Second round (lost to Simon Whitlock 0–3) (sets)

Performance timeline

References

External links

1997 births
Living people
English darts players
Professional Darts Corporation former tour card holders
People from Swadlincote
Sportspeople from Derbyshire
PDC ranking title winners